Ghuzak-e Rudbar (also Romanized as  Ghūzak-e Rūdbār) is a village in Lafur Rural District, North Savadkuh County, Mazandaran Province, Iran. At the 2006 census, its population was 44, in 11 families.

References 

Populated places in Savadkuh County